The 2011 Men's Hockey Champions Challenge II was the second edition of the for men. It was held in Lille, France, from July 2–10, 2011.

Teams
Eight teams participated in the tournament, they were:

 
 
 
 
 
 
 
  (Hosts)

Results
All times are Central European Summer Time (UTC+02:00)

First round

Pool A

Pool B

Second round

Quarterfinals

Fifth to eighth place classification

Crossover

Seventh and eighth place

Fifth and sixth place

First to fourth place classification

Semifinals

Third and fourth place

Final

Statistics

Final ranking

References

External links
 Official website
 Official FIH website

Men's Hockey Champions Challenge II
Champions Challenge II
Hockey
International field hockey competitions hosted by France
Sport in Lille
Hockey Champions Challenge II Men